The Bajaj Sunny was a scooter produced and sold by Bajaj Auto in India. Bajaj Auto no longer produces this vehicle. It had a 60  cc engine and a maximum speed of 50  km/h. It could carry a payload of up to 120 kg. It had a fuel tank capacity of 3.5 liters. Like most scooterettes, the Sunny was targeted at teenagers who were eligible to get a driving license for ungeared two-wheelers at 16 years of age.

The Sunny was a successful scooterette at that time. Bajaj stopped producing it in 1997. The Sunny Zip had a 60 cc engine and had a marginal power increase from its former model. The Sunny was a reliable two wheeler, and its two stroke engine offered a mileage of nearly 50  km/litre. Riding comfort was good and it was quite handsome in appearance. It had a single gear (automatically engaging) system, unlike  the variomatic transmission used in the Kinetic moped or scooters then, or the TVS Scootys now. Overall it was considered a very fine scooterette even for an aged person.

References

External links

Sunny
Indian motor scooters
Motorcycles introduced in 1991